Marco Antonio Mandosio or Marco Antonio Mondosio (1606–1638) was a Roman Catholic prelate who served as Bishop of Nicastro (1637–1638).

Biography
Marco Antonio Mandosio was born in Rome, Italy in 1606. On 7 September 1637, he was appointed during the papacy of Pope Urban VIII as Bishop of Nicastro. On 21 September 1637, he was consecrated bishop by Alessandro Cesarini (iuniore), Cardinal-Deacon of Santa Maria in Cosmedin, with Alfonso Gonzaga, Titular Archbishop of Rhodus, and Giovanni Battista Scanaroli, Titular Bishop of Sidon, serving as co-consecrators. He served as Bishop of Nicastro until his death in August 1638.

References

External links and additional sources
 (for Chronology of Bishops) 
 (for Chronology of Bishops)  

17th-century Italian Roman Catholic bishops
Bishops appointed by Pope Urban VIII
1606 births
1638 deaths